Mab-21-like 2 (C. elegans) is a protein that in humans is encoded by the MAB21L2 gene.

Function 

This gene is similar to the C. elegans MAB-21 cell fate-determining gene, a downstream target of transforming growth factor-beta signaling. It is thought that this gene may be involved in neural development. The protein encoded by this gene is primarily nuclear, although some cytoplasmic localization has been observed. [provided by RefSeq, Jul 2008].

References

Further reading